French Kitchener Chang-Him OBE (born 10 May 1938) is a Seychellois Anglican retired bishop who was active in the second half of the 20th century.

Born in Seychelles and son of Francis Chang-Him and Amelia Zoé, Chang-Him was educated at Lichfield Theological College and Trinity College, Toronto. He became a primary school teacher in 1958 and was ordained in 1962. After a curacy in Goole he was the rector of Praslin, then Archdeacon of the Seychelles and finally its Vicar general.  In 1979 he was appointed the Bishop of The Seychelles, resigning in 2004; and in 1984 the Archbishop of the Indian Ocean, resigning in 1995.

He was married to Susan Talma (died 1996) in 1975. The couple has two twin daughters.  He was made an OBE in 2014.

References

20th-century Anglican bishops in Africa
21st-century Anglican bishops in Africa
Anglican bishops of Seychelles
Anglican archbishops of the Indian Ocean
Seychellois Anglicans
Seychellois people of Chinese descent
20th-century Anglican archbishops
Living people
Alumni of Lichfield Theological College
1938 births
Honorary Officers of the Order of the British Empire